The Bandy World Championship G-17, also designated Bandy World Championship F-17, is a Youth Bandy World Championship for girls' teams up to the age of 17 years. This is the only Youth Bandy World Championship age group for female players. Usually, only the core bandy playing nations are taking part, but the United States has also appeared on more than one occasion.

The first Bandy World Championship G-17 was held in 2009, and it has since held biannually.

History

2015
The Swedish team won the 2015 World Championship G17, which was held at the Guidant John Rose Minnesota Oval,  in Roseville, Minnesota, United States, in February 2015. Sweden defeated Russia in the final and Finland beat the USA for the bronze medals. Norway has taken part before, but did not in 2015.

2017

Sweden managed to defend the championship in 2017, when the competition was held in Irkutsk in Russia. The Swedish girls beat Russia in the final, while Finland took the bronze medals in a match for third place against Norway. The United States did not come to this year's tournament, but China made their debut, finishing fifth and last.

Results

Medal table

References

Girls 17
Under-17 sport
Recurring sporting events established in 2009